Tarlo River is a national park located in New South Wales (Australia),  southwest of Sydney. Proclaimed in 1982, it contains a rugged, unusual landscape not found elsewhere in the region. Vehicular access is limited to a short stretch of Towrang Road that crosses its southern edge near the locality of Greenwich Park; the rest of the park is surrounded by private properties.

There is an exceptional Aboriginal cultural and historical heritage in this area.

See also
 Protected areas of New South Wales

References 

http://www.environment.nsw.gov.au/resources/parks/pomfinaltarlo.pdf

National parks of New South Wales
Protected areas established in 1982
1982 establishments in Australia